The castra of Târsa was a temporary fort erected by the Romans during the Trajan's Dacian Wars (101–102 AD, 105–106 AD).

See also
List of castra

Notes

External links

Roman castra from Romania - Google Maps / Earth

Roman fortified camps in Romania
Historic monuments in Hunedoara County